Emily Anne Taaffe is an Irish actress based in South London.

Early life and education
The youngest of five children, Emily was born to Noeleen and Eamonn Taaffe in Skerries, Ireland. The family moved when she was an infant to Tullyallen near Drogheda, County Louth where she lived until university. After receiving a First-Class Honours B.A. in 2005 from Trinity College Dublin, she was accepted to train at London Academy of Music and Dramatic Art (LAMDA) in London.

Personal life
In the summer of 2016 she married the writer Ben Schiffer.

Theatre
Taaffe has starred in a number of theatrical productions across the UK and Ireland. Her credits include: Daphne in an adaptation of Terry Pratchett’s Nation, Hannah Lambroke in Conor McPherson’s The Veil and Dunyasha in Howard Davies' production of The Cherry Orchard, all at the National Theatre, London. Taaffe played leading roles in The Comedy of Errors, The Tempest and Twelfth Night for The Royal Shakespeare Company in Stratford upon Avon and in London. Other credits include; The Crucible at Regent's Park Open Air Theatre, Three Sisters at both the Southwark Playhouse and the Abbey Theatre Dublin, The American Plan at The Theatre Royal Bath,  The House of Special Purpose at Minerva Theatre, Chichester and Intemperance at the Liverpool Everyman Theatre.

Television
Having begun to expand into screen work, Taaffe had a role in the CBC series X Company, an emotionally driven character drama set in World War II, and in the Victorian era detective drama, Ripper Street.  Additional TV credits include a role in the BBC's War and Peace, as well as guest roles in the BBC programmes New Tricks, Call the Midwife, Atlantis, Death in Paradise, and Informer. She has also appeared in ITV’s Vera and The Borgias.

References

External links
 
 YouTube
 Introducing Emily Taaffe from Official London Theatre
 A Younger Theatre

1984 births
21st-century Irish actresses
Alumni of the London Academy of Music and Dramatic Art
Irish stage actresses
Irish television actresses
Living people
Royal Shakespeare Company members